The Piano Sonata in C major, Hob. XVI/50, L.60, was written c. 1794 by Joseph Haydn.

Structure

The work has three movements.
Allegro
Adagio (in F major)
Allegro molto

History 

The sonata was written for and dedicated to Therese Jansen Bartolozzi c. 1794. Jansen Bartolozzi subsequently published the sonata c. 1800 with the title: "A Grand Sonata for the Piano Forte Composed Expressly for and dedicated to Mrs. Bartolozzi by Haydn ... Op. 79 ... London. Printed for, and to be had of the Proprietor 82 Wells Street and of the Publishers J. and H. Caulfield 36 Picadilly."

References
Notes

Sources
Haydn, Joseph. Haydn The Complete Piano Sonatas. Vol. 3. Edited by Maurice Hinson. Van Nuys: Alfred publishing Co. Inc., 1990.
Jones, David Wyn. Oxford Composer Companions: Haydn. Oxford: Oxford University Press, 2002.
Landon, H.C. Robbins. Haydn: Chronicle and Works. Vol 3. Haydn in England 1791–1795. London: Thames and Hudson, 1976.

External links
Franz Joseph Haydn (1732-1809) - Sonate Nr. 60 in C-Dur, Hob. XVI/50

Performance of Piano Sonata Hob. XVI/50 by George Li from the Isabella Stewart Gardner Museum in MP3 format

Piano sonatas by Joseph Haydn
1794 compositions
Compositions in C major